Russula pallidula is a species of agaric fungus in the family Russulaceae native to southern China.

References

pallidula
Fungi described in 2019
Fungi of China